Jeff Jerry Draheim (born 1963) is an American film editor. He mostly works in the Hollywood industry, especially in animation. He debuted with 1997 video game Disney's Animated Storybook: Hercules. His film credits include The Princess and the Frog, Frozen, Moana and Frozen II. He has won one Eddie Award and has been nominated for two Eddie and Annie Awards.

Early life 
Jeff Draheim was born in 1963 to Jan and Jerry Draheim, who lived in Omaha at that time. He graduated high school at Millard High School in 1981. He studied film and broadcast journalism at the University of Nebraska-Lincoln and University of Southern California.

Career 
Upon graduation he worked at Morin Advertising and KPTM television at Omaha and did video post-production at Avid, Inc. in Orlando. He joined Walt Disney Animation Studios in 1994 and worked as a lead editor for Florida division, creating animation for commercials, documentaries and theme park presentations. From there he gradually worked his way up to animated shorts and then features, working on movies like Brother Bear, The Princess and the Frog and the Academy Award winning 2014 short Feast. Later he worked on Frozen, Moana and Frozen II.

Personal life 
He lives in Valencia, California with his wife Adrienne and their two children.

Filmography

Editor

Editorial department

Miscellaneous crew

Accolades

References

External links 

Jeff Draheim on LinkedIn

American film editors
Living people
1963 births
University of Nebraska–Lincoln alumni
University of Southern California alumni
American animators
Walt Disney Animation Studios people